A by-election for the United Kingdom parliamentary constituency of West Lancashire was held on 9 February 2023, following the resignation of incumbent member of Parliament Rosie Cooper. She announced her resignation in order to take up the job as chair of Mersey Care NHS Foundation Trust. Ashley Dalton held the seat for Labour.

Background 
West Lancashire covers the southern part of the borough of the same name, with the major settlements being the towns of Burscough, Ormskirk and Skelmersdale. The rest of the population live in the surrounding villages. The seat is considered part of the red wall, and voted 55% in favour of Brexit in the 2016 EU membership referendum.

The constituency was created as the successor to Ormskirk for the 1983 United Kingdom general election and was held by Conservative Ken Hind until 1992 when it was taken for Labour by Colin Pickthall. Pickthall retired in 2005, and was succeeded by former Liberal Democrat candidate Rosie Cooper who was re-elected at each subsequent election. West Lancashire is considered a strong Labour seat.

Cooper had served as MP since the 2005 general election. She announced her resignation in September 2022. In November, The Times reported that Cooper was delaying her resignation in an attempt to secure a peerage, meaning that the writ of election could not be moved until January 2023 at the earliest. Cooper resigned her seat on 30 November, by means of being appointed as Steward of the Chiltern Hundreds. The by-election was the first scheduled in 2023 and was the first by-election held in the West Lancashire constituency.

Candidates
Andy Burnham, the Mayor of Greater Manchester, declined to run for Labour amid speculation that he may want to enter Parliament again in the future, and football broadcaster Gary Neville also declined to stand for the Labour Party's nomination.

In October 2022, Ashley Dalton, a candidate for Rochford and Southend East in 2017 and 2019, was confirmed as Labour's candidate for the by-election. Labour had shortlisted three women to be their candidate: Dalton; Emma Fox, former shortlisted candidate for Warrington South and daughter of Speaker of the House of Commons Lindsay Hoyle; and Louise Harbour, former deputy leader of Knowsley Council until she lost her seat in the 2022 local elections. Other candidates on the longlist had included councillor for Knowsley ward Adam Yates; county councillor for Skelmersdale West Julie Gibson; Michael Denoual; and Nikki Hennessy.

The Conservative Party confirmed in October 2022 that Mike Prendergast, an Ormskirk-based solicitor and councillor for Dukes ward on Sefton Council, would be their candidate in the by-election. 

The Liberal Democrats announced that Jo Barton, former councillor for Meols ward (also on Sefton Council) and candidate for the same constituency in the 2017 general election, would be their candidate.

Results

Previous result

References

2023 elections in the United Kingdom
2023 in England
2020s in Lancashire
By-elections to the Parliament of the United Kingdom in Lancashire constituencies
February 2023 events in the United Kingdom